Badges of the United States Air Force are specific uniform insignia authorized by the United States Air Force that signify aeronautical ratings, special skills, career field qualifications, and serve as identification devices for personnel occupying certain assignments.

Most Air Force badges are awarded in three degrees or skill levels. Aeronautical rating badges for pilots, combat systems officers, observers, and air battle managers are awarded at basic, senior, and command levels; while flight nurses and flight surgeons are awarded ratings at the basic, senior, and chief levels.  All other aviation badges are awarded at the basic, senior, and master levels.  Occupational badges are normally issued in basic, senior, and master level for officers.  Enlisted wear the basic badge after completing technical school, the senior badge after award of the 7-skill level, and the master badge as a master sergeant or above with 5 years in the specialty from award of the 7-skill level.  For non-rated commissioned officers, the basic badge is awarded after completion of technical training, the senior badge after 7-years in their respective AFSC, and master at 15-years.  A star and wreath system, worn above the Air Force badge, denotes which degree or skill level a service member currently holds.

Chaplain, aeronautical, space, cyberspace, and missile operations badges, along with the Air Force Commander's Insignia are mandatory for wear on Air Force uniforms. With the most recent changes to Air Force uniform regulations, restrictions have been lifted on the wear of other service's skill badges that Airman have earned.  Unless otherwise stated, the badges listed below are presented in order of precedence.  Precedence of badges within the same category depends on the airman's current assignment.

The Air Force is the most restrictive service with regards to which Air Force badges may be worn on the uniforms by other branches of the US Armed Forces.  Most badges issued exclusively by the Air Force may only be displayed on Air Force uniforms.  The exception to this rule is the Space Operations Badge.

The Air Force previously authorized continued use of a number of aviation badges originally issued by the U.S. Army during World War II.  Such badges are no longer authorized and are now categorized as obsolete badges.

Aviation Badges
Sources:

Aeronautical Rating Badges

Aircrew Badges

Joint Service Qualification Badges
As of 17 January 2014, Airmen are authorized to wear any qualification/skill badge they have earned on Air Force uniforms.  The qualification badges listed below are joint badges that are specifically awarded by the Air Force as well as other services.

Occupational Badges
An Air Force Occupational Badge is a military badge of the United States Air Force which is awarded to those members of the Air Force community who are engaged in duties "other than flying".  The purpose of the Air Force Occupational Badge is to denote and recognize training, education and qualifications received in a particular career field and to provide recognition in an outwardly displayed badge.

The first Air Force Occupational Badges began appearing on Air Force uniforms in the late 1950s.  Prior to this time, the only Air Force badges authorized were the Pilot Badge and other aeronautical rating badges, such as the Navigator Badge and Flight Surgeon Badge.

Operations Career Group

The following operations insignia are worn as beret crests on specific Air Force berets instead of the left breast of Air Force uniforms.  Both the breast insignia and the following beret crests signify the same thing, an Air Force specialty.

Logistics Career Group

Support Career Group

Professional Career Group

Acquisition Career Group

Medical Career Group

Reporting Identifiers

Duty Badges

Sources:

Tabs

Award Badges
Sources:

Air National Guard Badges

Notes
 * = also issued to Space Force guardians
 No asterisk indicates that the badge is only issued to airmen

See also
 U.S. Air Force aeronautical rating
 Military badges of the United States
 United States military beret flash
 Air Force Specialty Code

References

 Badges
United States military badges